Peace Street is a 1991 Estonian film directed by Roman Baskin.

Awards:
 1992: FilmFestival Cottbus (Germany), 1992, main prize - best film
 1992: European Film Awards, nomination: European Supporting Actor of the Year 1992: Väino Laes for Rahu tänav
 1993: Brussels International Independent Film Festival, participating

Plot

Cast
 Mikk Mikiver as Verner
 Jüri Järvet as Jaak
 Katrin Karisma as	Agnes
 Maria Avdjuško as Lilka
 Lauri Vihman as Lauri
 Arvo Kukumägi	as Uugu
 Kaljo Kiisk as Eugen
 Väino Laes as Peeter
 Kersti Kreismann as Inga
 Helene Vannari as	Selma
 Elisabet Reinsalu	as Rita 
 Tõnu Kilgas as Kuno
 Mihkel Pulk as Tiit
 Laine Mägi as Lagle
 Sulev Luik as Tiidus
 Maimu Vannas as Loreida
 Härmo Saarm as Officer

References

External links
 
 Rahu tänav, entry in Estonian Film Database (EFIS)

1991 films
Estonian drama films
1991 drama films